Continuing education, also known as lifelong education or lifelong learning is an all-encompassing term within a broad list of post-secondary learning activities and programs. The term is used mainly in the United States and Canada.

Recognized forms of post-secondary learning activities within the domain include: degree credit courses by non-traditional students, non-degree career training, college remediation, workforce training, and formal personal enrichment courses (both on-campus and online).

General continuing education is similar to adult education, at least in being intended for adult learners, especially those beyond traditional undergraduate college or university age.

Frequently, in the United States and Canada continuing education courses are delivered through a division or school of continuing education of a college or university known sometimes as the university extension or extension school. The Organisation for Economic Co-operation and Development argued, however, that continuing education should be "'fully integrated into institutional life rather than being often regarded as a separate and distinctive operation employing different staff' if it is to feed into mainstream programmes and be given the due recognition deserved by this type of provision".

Georgetown University, Michigan State University, and the University of Denver have benefited from non-credit programs as it relates to strengthening partnerships with corporations and government agencies, helping to inform and shape the curriculum for degree programs, and generating revenue to support the academic enterprise.

History
In the United Kingdom, Oxford University's Department for Continuing Education was founded in 1878, and the Institute of Continuing Education of Cambridge University dates to the 1873.

The Chautauqua Institution, originally the Chautauqua Lake Sunday School Assembly, was founded in 1874 "as an educational experiment in out-of-school, vacation learning. It was successful and broadened almost immediately beyond courses for Sunday school teachers to include academic subjects, music, art and physical education."

Cornell University was among higher education institutions that began offering university-based continuing education, primarily to teachers, through extension courses in the 1870s. As noted in the Cornell Era of February 16, 1877, the university offered a "Tour of the Great Lakes" program for "teachers and others" under the direction of Professor Theodore B. Comstock, head of Cornell's department of geology.

The University of Wisconsin–Madison began its continuing education program in 1907. The New School for Social Research, founded in 1919, was initially devoted to adult education. In 1969, Empire State College, a unit of the State University of New York, was the first institution in the US to exclusively focus on providing higher education to adult learners. In 1976 the University of Florida created its own Division of Continuing Education and most courses were offered on evenings or weekends to accommodate the schedules of working students.

The method of delivery of continuing education can include traditional types of classroom lectures and laboratories.  However, many continuing education programs make heavy use of distance education, which not only includes independent study, but can also include videotaped material, broadcast programming or online education which has more recently dominated the distance learning community.

For professionals 

Within the domain of continuing education, professional continuing education is a specific learning activity generally characterized by the issuance of a certificate or continuing education units (CEU) for the purpose of documenting attendance at a designated seminar or course of instruction.  Licensing bodies in a number of fields (such as teaching and healthcare) impose continuing education requirements on members who hold licenses to continue practicing a particular profession. These requirements are intended to encourage professionals to expand their foundations of knowledge and stay up-to-date on new developments.

Depending on the field, these requirements may be satisfied through college or university coursework, extension courses or conferences and seminars attendance.  Although individual professions may have different standards, the most widely accepted standard, developed by the International Association for Continuing Education & Training, is that ten contact hours equals one Continuing Education Unit. Not all professionals use the CEU convention. For example, the American Psychological Association accredits sponsors of continuing education and uses simply a CE approach. In contrast to the CEU, the CE credit is typically one CE credit for each hour of contact.

In the spring of 2009, Eduventures, a higher education consulting firm, released the results of a study that illustrated that the recession had made a significant impact on the views of prospective continuing education students. A survey of 1,500 adults who planned to enroll in a course or program within the next two years determined that while nearly half of respondents believed that the value of education had risen due to the recession, over two-thirds said the state of the economy had affected their plans to pursue continuing education.

The World Bank's 2019 World Development Report on the future of work  explains that flexible learning opportunities at universities and adult learning programs that allow workers to retrain and retool are vital in order for labor markets to adjust to the future of work.

See also

 Continuing education unit
 Continuing legal education
 Continuing medical education
 Community education
 Dual enrollment
 E-learning
 Independent scholar
 Lifelong learning
 National Council of Labour Colleges
 Workers' Educational Association in Australia and the UK

References

Further reading 
Wilson, A. L., & Hayes, E. (Eds.). (2009). Handbook of adult and continuing education. John Wiley & Sons. Chicago

External links
 University Professional and Continuing Education Association
 International Association for Continuing Education & Training
 Association for Continuing Higher Education
 American Association for Adult and Continuing Education
 Canadian Association for University Continuing Education
 Engage-To-Excel Initiative For Continuing Education
 Canadian Journal of University Continuing Education contains many researched articles about the field, in French and English.

 
Educational stages
Personal development
Universities and colleges
Tertiary education

sv:Folkbildning